Cyme biagi is a moth of the family Erebidae. It is found in New Guinea.

References

Nudariina
Moths described in 1908
Moths of New Guinea